Emory is a common English language masculine given name variant of Emery, of Old German origin (meaning 'home strength, industrious leader'). Emory is also a common English language surname.

Given name

People with the given name include:
 Emory Bellard (born 1927), American college football coach
 Emory L. Bennett American soldier awarded Medal of Honor
 Emory S. Bogardus (1882–1973), American sociologist who founded the sociology department at the University of Southern California
 Emory Campbell, Gullah community leader of South Carolina and Georgia, USA
 Emory Cohen (born 1990), American actor
 Emory Leon Chaffee (1885–1975), American physicist
 Emory Douglas (born 1943), American graphic designer for the Black Panther Party
 Emory Ellis (1906-2003), American biochemist
 Emory Folmar (born 1930), American politician
 Emory Hale (1969–2006), American professional wrestler
 Emory Holloway (1885–1977), American author
 Emory King (1931–2007), Belizean historian, author and journalist
 Emory S. Land (1879–1971), American Naval officer
 Emory Long (1911-1976), American baseball player
 Emory Conrad Malick (1881-1959), American aviator
 Emory McClintock (1840–1916), American actuary
 Emory B. Pottle (1815–1891), American politician
 Emory H. Price (1899–1976), American politician
 Emory Rains (1800–1878), American politician
 Emory Remington (1891–1971), American trombonist
 Emory Sekaquaptewa (1928–2007), American Hopi leader and scholar
 Emory M. Sneeden (1927–1987), American judge
 Emory Sparrow, American professional hockey forward
 Emory Tate (1958–2015), American International Master of chess
 Emory Andrew Tate III (born 1986) British-American internet personality and kickboxer
 Emory M. Thomas (born 1939), American university professor
 Emory Upton (1839–1881), American general
 Emory Washburn (1800–1877), American politician

Surname

People with the surname Emory include:
D. Hopper Emory (1841–1916), American politician
Dave Emory (born 1949), American talk radio host
Ed Emory (1937–2013), American football coach
John Emory (1789–1835), American Methodist bishop, eponym of Emory University
Julia Emory (1885–1979), American suffragist
Kenneth Emory (1897–1992), American anthropologist
Logan Emory (born 1988), American soccer player
Ron Emory (born 1962), American rock musician, member of TSOL
Sonny Emory (born 1962), American drummer
Steven Emory (born 1989), American soccer player
William Hemsley Emory (1811–1887), American army officer and surveyor

Fictional characters
Fictional characters with the name include:
Emory, an Aqua Teen Hunger Force character

See also

 Emery (disambiguation)

References

Masculine given names
English given names